Ernst-Wiggo Sandbakk (born 28 September 1957) is a Norwegian jazz musician (drums) and music tescher. Known from a series of concerts, festival performances and records with the likes of DumDum Boys, Thorgeir Stubø, Frode Alnæs, Palle Mikkelborg, Terje Bjørklund, Vigleik Storaas, Bjørn Alterhaug, Nils Petter Molvær, Knut Riisnæs, John Pål Inderberg, Sondre Meisfjord, Jan Gunnar Hoff, Kjersti Stubø and Henning Sommerro.

Career
Sandbakk was born in Kjeldebotn, Ballangen.  He appeared on Thorgeir Stubø's first album Notice, later establishing himself in Trondheim, where he teaches on the Jazz programat at the Trondheim Musikkonservatorium, where he holds an instrumental teaching degree from 1982. In addition he is Associate professor at the Musikkonservatoriet i Tromsø, and has also written several textbooks on drumming like Hvordan spille moderne trommesett, to mention one.

Sandbakk appeared on the album Blodig Alvor (1988), with the renowned Norwegian rock band DumDum Boys, playing drums on the song "Idyll". In 1993 he initiated the band Oofotr in Narvik, together with jazz singer Kjersti Stubø, daughter of the legendary jazz guitarist Thorgeir Stubø, and the pianist Jørn Øien.

Sandbakk has worked as Program Director at NTNU Department of Music, Performing music, in addition to teach the drum set and aural training. He is managing director of Trondheim Jazz Festival, has been freelance musician since 1977, and has played with such orchestras as "Trondheim Sympatiorkester", "Trondheim Bop-Service", "Konerne Ved Vandposten", "Arvid Martinsen Band", "Bjørn Willadsen Band", "Gunnar A. Berg & The Music Machine", "E.W.S. & The Sympathy Orchestra" (including keyboardist Arve Furset and pianist Jørn Øien). He also plays on a regular basis with his own prosjects Oofotr and Afrocadabra".

Discography

Solo works
1998: Sympathetic, "E.W.S. & The Sympathy Orchestra»

Collaborative works 
Within Oofotr
Oofotr (Norske Gram, 1995)
Oofotr II (Heilo, 2001)

With John Pål Inderberg
2000: Baritone Landscape (Gemini Records), within "The Zetting»
2004: Sval Draum (Taurus Records)

With other projects
1981: Notice (Odin Records), with Thorgeir Stubø
1982: It's Just A Game (Experience Records), with "Arvid Martinsen Band»
1988: Blodig Alvor Na Na Na Na Na (CBS Records), with DumDum Boys "Idyll"
2012: Eg Vandrar Langs Kaiane (Øra Fonogram), with Annjo K. Greenall
2014: Exit Sigurd Bjørhovde Groups,  recorded 1981
2013: Live No Evil Sigurd Bjørhovde Quintet, recorded 1980

References

External links 
Ernst-Wiggo Sandbakk Profile on NTNU (in Norwegian)
Sandbakk, Ernst-Wiggo Publications on Cristin Current Research Information SysTem in Norway

1957 births
Living people
Musicians from Ballangen
20th-century Norwegian drummers
21st-century Norwegian drummers
Norwegian jazz drummers
Male drummers
Norwegian jazz composers
Norwegian writers
Academic staff of the Norwegian University of Science and Technology
20th-century drummers
Male jazz composers
20th-century Norwegian male musicians
21st-century Norwegian male musicians
Oofotr members